The Ministry of Defence is a department of the Albanian Government, in charge of the formation and implementation of national security and ordering, coordinating and carrying out the general guidelines of the Cabinet about the defence policy, and is the headquarters of the Military of Albania. It is Albania's ministry of defence.

The Defence Minister of Albania is the nominal head of all the military, serving under the President of Albania, who is the commander-in-chief of the Armed Forces of Albania. The defence minister exercises the administrative and operational authority over the military. The armed forces under the Ministry of Defence are primarily responsible for ensuring the territorial integrity of the nation.

Structure
The Ministry of Defence includes numerous smaller agencies aside from the three main branches of the military. These include the Authority of the State Export Control, the Military Export Import Company, the Center of Culture, Media, and Defence Publications, the Inter-Institutional Maritime Operation Center, and the Defence Intelligence Security Agency. These agencies, centers, and offices report to the Minister of Defence.

Authority of the State Export Control
The Authority of the State Export Control (AKSHE) (Albanian: Autoriteti i Kontrollit Shtetëror të Eksporteve) is the agency tasked with controlling the export, import, and transportation of military goods.

Center of Culture, Media, and Defence Publications
The Center of Culture, Media, and Defence Publications (QKMBM) (Albanian: Qendra e Kulturës, Medias, Botimeve të Mbrojtjes, Muzeut dhe Shtëpive të Pushimit) is an organization involved in public relations and general communications for the Ministry of Defence. It is itself composed of the Directorate of Public Relations and Communications, the Directorate of Publications, the Directorate of the Community Relations Activities, and the Directorate of Sports Activities.

Inter-Institutional Maritime Operation Center
The Inter-Institutional Maritime Operation Center (IMOC) (Albanian: Qendra Ndërinstitucionale Operacionale Detare) is an inter-ministry agency tasked with managing Albania's maritime territory. It is a collaboration between the Ministries of Defence, Internal Affairs, Finance, Environment, Transportation, Agriculture, and Tourism.

Defence Intelligence Security Agency
The Defence Intelligence Security Agency (DISA) (Albanian: Agjencia e Inteligjencës dhe Sigurisë së Mbrojtjes (AISM)) is a military intelligence agency within the Ministry of Defence, which provides intelligence to the Ministry as well as the Albanian Armed Forces. It is governed by Law No. 65/2014.

Reorganization
Since the establishment of the institution, the Ministry of Defence has undergone several administrative changes to its organizational structure. When a new department was formed, it often merged with the ministry thus expanding its role, subsequently leading to the name of the ministry being changed. If that department later broke off as a separate ministry or was dissolved, the ministry reverted to its original name.

 Ministry of War (1912–1939)
 Ministry of War and Defence Command (1944–1946)
 Ministry of National Defence (1946–1950)
 Ministry of People's Defence (1950–1991)
 Ministry of Defence (1991–present)

Subordinate institutions
 Armed Forces Academy 
 Export Control State Authority (AKSHE)
 Center of Culture, Media and Defence Publications (QKMBM)
 Inter-Institutional Marine Operation Center (QNOD)

Officeholders (1912–present)

Notes

See also
 Military of Albania

References

Politics of Albania
Defense
1912 establishments in Albania
Albania
Albania
Albania